The House of Angelos, feminine form Angelina, plural Angeloi, was a Byzantine Greek noble lineage which rose to prominence through the marriage of its founder, Constantine Angelos, with Theodora Komnene, the youngest daughter of Emperor Alexios I Komnenos. As imperial relatives, the Angeloi held various high titles and military commands under Emperor Manuel I Komnenos. In 1185, following a revolt against Andronikos I Komnenos, Isaac II Angelos rose to the throne, the first of three Angeloi emperors who ruled until 1204. The period was marked by the decline and fragmentation of the Byzantine Empire, culminating in its dissolution by the Fourth Crusade in 1204.

After the Fourth Crusade, another branch of the family managed to establish an independent state in Epirus. The members of this branch largely eschewed the use of the 'Angelos' surname in favour of the more prestigious 'Doukas' and 'Komnenos', and are collectively known as the Komnenodoukai. From Epirus, they quickly expanded to rule Thessaly and Macedonia. In , Theodore Komnenos Doukas conquered Thessalonica, and founded the Empire of Thessalonica, claiming the Byzantine imperial title in rivalry to the Empire of Nicaea. His empire quickly collapsed after the Battle of Klokotnitsa in 1230. Thessalonica was lost to Nicaea in 1246, and the prospects of recovering Constantinople were dashed at the Battle of Pelagonia in 1259, followed by the re-establishment of the Byzantine Empire under the Palaiologos dynasty in 1261. Often in rivalry to the new Byzantine regime, the Komnenodoukai nevertheless secured recognition and titles from Constantinople, and retained their control over Thessaly (ruled by a cadet line) and Epirus until 1318.

Overview

Early members
The lineage was founded by Constantine Angelos, a minor noble from Philadelphia (Asia Minor). According to the 12th-century historian John Zonaras, Constantine was brave, skilled and very handsome, but of lowly origin. The family's surname is commonly held to have derived from the Greek word for 'angel', but such an origin is rarely attested in Byzantine times. Another theory suggests that their name instead derives from A[ngel, a district near Amida in Upper Mesopotamia. The historian Suzanne Wittek-de Jongh suggested that Constantine was the son of a certain patrikios Manuel Angelos, whose possessions near Serres were confirmed by a chrysobull of Emperor Nikephoros III, but this is considered unlikely by other scholars.

Despite his lowly origin, Constantine managed to win the heart of Theodora Komnene (born 1097), the fourth daughter of Emperor Alexios I Komnenos and Irene Doukaina. Constantine and Theodora had seven children, three sons and four daughters. Through his sons, Constantine was the progenitor of the Angelos dynasty, which produced three Byzantine emperors in 1185–1204, as well as the Komnenos Doukas dynasty that ruled over Epirus and Thessalonica in the 13th–14th centuries.

Imperial Angelos dynasty
Constantine's third son Andronikos Doukas Angelos, was the progenitor of the imperial Angelos dynasty. In 1185, Andronikos' son Isaac II Angelos deposed Andronikos I Komnenos and was proclaimed Byzantine Emperor. Irene Angelina, a daughter of Isaac II Angelos, married Philip of Swabia, King of the Germans. Their daughters married into a number of western European royal and princely families. Many of the extant aristocratic families of Europe are, therefore, descendants of the Angeloi. Isaac was deposed by his brother Alexios III Angelos, who was in turn overthrown by Alexios IV Angelos with the aid of the Fourth Crusade. Under the corrupt and dissolute reign of the Angelos dynasty, the Byzantine empire deteriorated and soon fell prey to Latin crusaders and Venetians in the Fourth Crusade.

Komnenodoukai of Epirus and Thessalonica
The Angelos line was continued by the descendants of Constantine's eldest son, the sebastokrator John Doukas. Like John, most of his descendants eschewed the surname "Angelos" and used either "Doukas" or "Komnenos Doukas", after which they are known in modern scholarship as the Komnenodoukai (Κομνηνοδούκαι).

After the fall of Constantinople and the establishment of the Latin Empire in 1204, John Doukas' illegitimate son, Michael I Komnenos Doukas, founded the Despotate of Epirus, choosing the city of Arta as its capital. In 1224, Michael's half-brother Theodore captured the Kingdom of Thessalonica from the crusaders and proclaimed himself as the legitimate Byzantine emperor (basileus) in Thessalonica. However, Theodore was defeated and captured by John II Asen in the Battle of Klokotnitsa in 1230, and the Empire of Thessalonica quickly declined. During Theodore's captivity, his brother Manuel ruled over Thessalonica, succeeded by Theodore's sons John and Demetrios. Eventually, the city was lost to the Nicaean emperor John III Doukas Vatatzes in 1246, marking the end of the rule of the Angeloi in Thessalonica.

In 1230, Theodore's nephew Michael II, son of Michael I, established himself as ruler of Epirus and Thessaly. After the death of Michael II in 1271, Epirus was ruled by his legitimate son Nikephoros I, while Thessaly was given to his illegitimate son John I Doukas. In 1318, Nicholas Orsini murdered Nikephoros' son Thomas, ending the rule of the family in Epirus. In Thessaly, John I Doukas was succeeded by his son Constantine, followed by John II, who ruled from 1302/03 until his death in 1318. In the same year, the south of Thessaly was seized by the Catalan Grand Company and annexed to the Duchy of Athens, while the north passed to a series of autonomous magnates.

Having re-established Byzantine control over Epirou and Thessaly in 1340, emperor Andronikos III Palaiologos appointed the pinkernes (cup-bearer) John Angelos, a nephew of megas domestikos John Kantakouzenos, to the governorship of Epirus. John extended his rule to Thessaly in 1342, but died from the plague in 1348. Epirus and Thessaly were conquered by the Serbian ruler Stefan Dušan soon afterwards.

Descendants of John Angelos continued to govern Thessaly under Simeon Uroš and John Uroš. John Uroš, the last Nemanjić, abdicated in favour of Alexios Angelos Philanthropenos, the kaisar of Thessaly. Alexios' brother Manuel Angelos Philanthropenos was the last Byzantine Greek ruler of Thessaly.

After the Ottoman conquest of Thessaly in 1394, the Angeloi Philanthropenoi took refuge in Serbia. A grandson of either Alexios or Manuel, Mihailo Anđelović, served as an official at the court of Đurađ and Lazar Branković. Mihailo's brother Mahmud, captured in his infancy by Ottoman soldiers, was brought to Adrianople, where he converted to Islam. He later rose to the highest ranks of the Ottoman Empire, becoming beylerbey of Rumelia in 1451 and Grand Vizier in 1455. Thus, in the negotiations between Serb despot Lazar Branković and Mehmed II in 1457, the two sides were represented by the brothers Mihailo and Mahmud Anđelović.

Family tree for the Imperial House of Angelos

See also 
History of the Byzantine Empire
Byzantine Empire under the Angelos dynasty

References

Sources 

 
 
 
 
 
 
 
 
 

Angelid dynasty